Tony Sperandeo (born 8 May 1953) is an Italian actor of cinema and television. Sperandeo is notable for frequently playing the roles of tough characters from his native region, Sicily. As of 2011, he was working on La Nuova Squadra, a police drama televised by Rai Tre, as the Superintendent Salvatore Sciacca.

Career
He was born Gaetano Sperandeo in Palermo.

In 1983, his acting career began with a small part in the film Kaos, directed by the Taviani brothers. In 1985, he landed a role in a cinematographic film Pizza Connection, by Damiano Damiani. He also acted in four of the sequels of the popular television drama, "La piovra", which is about the Mafia and had a little role in The Sicilian of Michael Cimino. He has appeared in many other Italian films, the most notable being La scorta ("The escort") by Ricky Tognazzi, as well as "Ragazzi fuori" and "Mery per sempre", the latter two set in his home town of Palermo. They are both directed by Marco Risi.

Since 2004, he has appeared regularly on television in the role of Superintendent Salvatore Sciacca, first in the police drama La Squadra (2004–2007), and its sequel, La Nuova Squadra (2008–2009, 2011).

In 2001, Sperandeo won the David di Donatello award for Best Supporting Actor in "I cento passi" ("One Hundred Steps"), directed by Marco Tullio Giordana, about the story of Peppino Impastato in which he played the role of Mafia boss Tano Badalamenti.

Personal life
He was married to actress Rita Barbanera (1968–2001), by whom he has two children, Tony and Priscilla. Sperandeo met her on the set of Mery per sempre, the film in which he was working at the time. They performed together in one film, La discesa di Aclà a Floristella in 1992. Rita was primarily a stage actress.

On April 27, 2001, Rita Barbanera committed suicide by jumping off the balcony at their home in Palermo. She was thirty two years old.

Filmography

Film

 Kaos (1984)
 Pizza Connection (1985) - Vincenzo
 The Repenter (1985) - Lercara's Henchman (uncredited)
 The Sicilian (1987) - Barracks Policeman #1
 Mery per sempre (1989) - Turris, Guardia Carceraria
 Tre colonne in cronaca (1990) - Il commissario Trapani
 Il sole anche di notte (1990) - Gesuino
 Ragazzi fuori (1990) - Turris (uncredited)
 Una storia semplice (1991) - Policeman
 Il muro di gomma (1991) - Sottufficiale Areonautica
 Piedipiatti (1991) - Agente Buoncostume
 Johnny Stecchino (1991) - Picciotto in auto
 Caldo soffocante (1991) - Aiutante Giuliano
 Briganti (1991)
 Acla's Descent into Floristella (1992) - Caramazza
 La scorta (1993) - Raffaele Frasca
 Uomo di rispetto (1993, TV Movie)
 Quattro bravi ragazzi (1993) - Franchini
 Nel continente nero (1993) - Don Secondino
 The Heroes (1994) - Tonino
 Miracolo italiano (1994) - Onorevole Locafò
 Briganti: Amore e libertà (1994) - Malacarne
 Segreto di stato (1995) - Gangster
 The Star Maker (1995) - 1st Baldalamenti
 Palermo - Milan One Way (1995) - Marinnà
 Vesna va veloce (1996) - Il camionista
 Altri uomini (1997) - Salvatore Marinello
 The Room of the Scirocco (1998) - Sollima
 Volare! (1999) - Don Ciccio
 Una sola debole voce (1998, TV Movie)
 Excellent Cadavers (1999, TV Movie) - Stefano Bontade
 L'uomo della fortuna (2000) - Salvatore
 One Hundred Steps (2000) - Gaetano Badalamenti
 Un giudice di rispetto (2000) - Giudice Francesco Di Nardo
 Arresti domiciliari (2000) - Boss mafia
 E adesso sesso (2001) - Don Calogero
 Tra due mondi (2001)
 Il testimone (2001, TV Movie)
 Il latitante (2003) - Ispettore Sarnataro
 Miracle in Palermo! (2003) - Sparagna
 Eccezziunale... Veramente - Capitolo secondo... me (2006) - Don Pippo Calì
 Il 7 e l'8 (2007) - Gino La Monica
 L'uomo di vetro (2007) - Zio Titta
 A Beautiful Wife (2007) - Don Pierino
 Il sangue dei vinti (2008) - Salustri
 Volevo gli occhi blu (2008) - Pazzo filosofo
 Baaria (2009) - Breeder
 Pochi giorni per capire (2009) - Sacerdote
 I Picciuli (2009) - Giudice
 Un neomelodico presidente (2010) - Il Professore
 Backward (2010) - Gaetano il bastardo
 Prigionero di un segreto (2010) - Don Alfredo
 Dreamland: La terra dei sogni (2011) - Don Nicola
 Pagate fratelli (2012)
 Il ragioniere della mafia (2013) - Capo dei capi
 La moglie del sarto (2014)
 La corona spezzata (2014) - Don Vito Romano
 La settima onda (2015) - Michele Manni
 Il ragazzo della Giudecca (2016) - Procuratore
 Quel bravo ragazzo (2016) - Vito Mancuso
 Amo la tempesta (2016)
 Mò Vi Mento - Lira di Achille (2017)
 L'ora legale (2017) - Gaetano Patanè
 Il mondo di mezzo (2017) - Gaetano Mariotti
 Amare Amaro (2018) - Marcello

Television

 La piovra,  (1985, TV Mini-Series) - Ravanusa's Manservant
 Felipe ha gli occhi azzurri (1991)
 La piovra,  (1992, TV Mini-Series) - Santino Rocchi
 A che punto è la notte (1995, TV Movie) - Cagliusco
 Non parla più (1995, TV Movie)
 La piovra,  (1997, TV Movie) - Turi Mondello
 Mia Padre e Innocente (1997, TV Movie) - Augusto Malinverni
 La piovra,  (1998, TV Movie) - Turi Mondello
 Fine secolo (1999, TV Mini-Series) - Corti
 Cronaca di un ricatto (1999, TV Movie)
 Don Matteo (first series, episode "Stato di Ebbrezza", 2000)
 L'attentatuni (2001, TV Movie) - Antonino No&
 Distretto di Polizia (2001) - Vito Tonnara
 Il sequestro Soffrantini (2002, TV Movie) - Giovanni Farina, Anonima Sarda
 Soldati di pace (2003)
 Blindati (2003, TV Movie) - Brando Massari
 Ultimo - L'infiltrato (2003, TV Movie) - Nicola De Rosa
 La Squadra (2005–2007) - Sovrintendente Salvatore Sciacca
 Framed! A Sicilian Murder Mystery (2022-)

References

 Internet Movie Database
 Italian Wikipedia
 Viva Cinema, Interview with Tony Sperandeo, 28 October 2008 (retrieved on 10 November 2008)

1953 births
Living people
Male actors from Palermo
Italian male film actors
Italian male television actors
Italian comedy musicians
David di Donatello winners
Ciak d'oro winners